Mythimna alopecuri is a species of moth of the family Noctuidae. It is found in southern Europe, Turkey, the Caucasus region, Israel, Jordan, Iraq, Iran, the European part of southern Russia, Ukraine, Kazakhstan and Turkmenistan.

Adults are on wing from April to May and from September to October. There are two generations per year.

The larvae probably feed on various Gramineae species.

References

External links
Lepiforum.de

Mythimna (moth)
Moths of Europe
Moths of Asia
Moths described in 1840
Taxa named by Jean Baptiste Boisduval